The Bayandur is a Turkic tribe.

Bayandur may also refer to:

Bayandur, Armenia
Vaghatur, Armenia
Bayandur, Azerbaijan

See also
 Bayandor (disambiguation)
 Bayannur
 Bayandun